Segarra may refer to:

People
Antulio Segarra (1906-1989), officer in the United States Army
Araceli Segarra (born 1970), first Spanish woman to climb to the summit of Mount Everest
Aurelia Ramos de Segarra (1860-1927), Uruguayan philanthropist, founder of the Uruguayan Red Cross
Francisco Segarra Simón (born 1976), Spanish swimmer
Iván Segarra Báez (born 1967), Puerto Rican poet
Joan Segarra (1927-2008), Spanish footballer
Josh Segarra (born 1986), American actor
Leo Segarra Sánchez (born 1981), Spanish singer
Marta Segarra (born 1963), Spanish philologist], university professor, and researcher
Ninfa Segarra, American attorney and politician
Nino Segarra (born 1954), Puerto Rican singer-songwriter and musician
Pedro Segarra (born 1959), American politician and mayor of Hartford, Connecticut

Places
Segarra, comarca in the Province of Lleida, Catalonia, Spain
Aguilar de Segarra
Calonge de Segarra
Granyena de Segarra
Montoliu de Segarra
Montornès de Segarra
Tarroja de Segarra